Takashi Uemura may refer to:

Takashi Uemura (footballer) a Japanese association football forward
Takashi Uemura (academic) former journalist and lecturer